Duane Adolph Moody (born December 3, 1970) is an American tenor solo artist and also a member of the African-American trio Three Mo' Tenors. In addition to performing, he is an associate professor teaching voice at Berklee College of Music and former instructor and coach with the Levine School of Music in Washington DC.

Life and career
Moody was born in Washington, D.C. He studied vocal performance and operatic studies at The Peabody Institute, from which he graduated in 1994. In addition, he went to Boston University and obtained his Master of Music in Vocal Performance in 1997. After his M.M. in music, he went back to The Peabody Institute in 2001 and graduated with a diploma in opera performance.

After finishing his musical studies, he  went on an international tour as Sportin' Life in Gershwin's Porgy and Bess from 1999 to 2005. He has been involved with the Three Mo' Tenors group since 2007. Moody has made multiple debuts as a tenor at The Royal Festival Hall (London), Tel Aviv Opera (Israel), Hamburg Staatsoper (Hamburg, Germany), Alte Oper (Frankfurt, Germany), Des Moines Opera, Dayton Opera, New York City Opera (touring company) and has been presented in a premiere solo recital at The Terrace Theatre of The John F. Kennedy Center for the Performing Arts (Washington, DC). He has also done orchestral appearances with The Fayetteville Symphony Orchestra, The Indianapolis Symphony Orchestra (Pop Series), The Spokane Symphony (Pop Series), The Reading Symphony and The Frederick Symphony in their presentation of Beethoven’s 9th symphony. In 2014 he sang in the world premiere of Lawrence Reis's cantata, Sea Surface Full of Clouds with the Washington Metropolitan Philharmonic, and in 2015 released his latest album Sur Mon Voyage which includes works by Wolfgang Amadeus Mozart, Franz Liszt, Richard Strauss and Elliot Carter.

Awards
 2002 DC Commission on the Arts and Humanities, Outstanding Emerging Artist  
 1995 Regional Semi-Finalist, Metropolitan Opera National Council Auditions

Performances

Opera

 Leoncavallo, Tonio in I Pagliacci, MD L. Opera
 Principal Artist, Three Mo’ Tenors, Little Schubert
 Proto/Chenault, Young Joe in Shadowboxer, MD Opera Studio
 Gershwin, Sportin’ Life in Porgy and Bess, International Tours
 Weiser, Phillip Herriton in Where Angels Fear To Tread, Peabody Opera (world premiere)
 Massanet, Des Grieux in Manon Peabody Opera
 Mozart, 2nd Priest in Die Zauberflöte Peabody Opera

Oratorio 

 G. F. Handel Messiah Reading Symphony
 Dubois The Seven Last Words St. Luke’s Episcopal
 Saint-Saens Christmas Oratorio St. Luke’s Episcopal
 L. V. Beethoven 9th Symphony Reading Symphony

Discography 

 2001 Three Mo’ Tenors, Three Mo’ Tenors: Live in Chicago Recorded at The Oriental Theater
 2010 INSPIRATA, Sacred Sounds. Recorded at A1A Studios, Jacksonville, FL
 2013 A Christmas Recital: Live
 2016 Sur Mon Voyage

References

External links

Biography on the official website of Three Mo' Tenors

American operatic tenors
Singers from Washington, D.C.
Boston University College of Fine Arts alumni
Berklee College of Music faculty
1970 births
Living people
21st-century American opera singers
21st-century American male singers
21st-century American singers
Peabody Institute alumni